The Ducati 888 was a motorcycle manufactured by Ducati as an upgrade to the Ducati 851.  The earlier 851 had introduced liquid cooling, computerized fuel injection and four-valve heads to the company's two cylinder motors.  In 1991 Ducati increased the capacity of the 851 to 888 cc to create the 888.  Both engines featured the Desmoquattro valvetrain concept in which a four valve per cylinder motor was given desmodromic valve actuation, with cams both opening and closing the valves. Ducati's desmodromic system reduces the frictional penalty from conventional valve springs.

Production figures known for the various models are:

1991 models: 1200 × 851 Stradas, 534 × SP3 & 16 × SPS. A total of 1850 units.

1992 models: 1402 × 851 Stradas, 500 × SP4 & 101 × SPS. A total of 2003 units.

1993 models: 1280 × 888 Stradas, 500 × SP5 & 290 × SPO - for the American market. A total of 2070 units.

1994 models: 1571 × 888 Stradas & 100 SPO for the American market. A total of 1671 units.
Over all years there was a grand total of 7594 units produced.

Riding the Ducati 888, Doug Polen won first place in the 1991 and 1992 World Superbike Championships.  After losing to Kawasaki in the 1993 World Superbike Championship, Ducati ceased production of the Ducati 888 and released the Ducati 916 which had a larger engine capacity.

Continuing refinement yielded the next two generations of the Ducati Desmoquattro superbike, resulting in the 916/996 and 999 lines.

Racing history
 1991 Doug Polen - Ducati 888SBK
 1992 Doug Polen - Ducati 888SBK

Notes

External links

 Ducati 888 SBK91 at Ducati.com Heritage.
 Ducati 888 SBK92 at Ducati.com Heritage.

888
Sport bikes
Motorcycles introduced in 1991
Motorcycles introduced in 1992